Commercial location development (CLD) is a method used by the public sector to position its territory and create a good frame condition for the development of its economy. After having made a thorough diagnosis of the actual situation the public entities design a Marketing strategy of the location, which includes, as in any marketing mix, the target groups definition (type of enterprises they want to conserve or attract), the offer, the pricing, the promotion and the sale's strategy. The topic includes the recruitment and retention of the appropriate human capital.

The design of a CLD strategy allows local governments to manage their territorial and economic development accorded to fixed and legitimized goals instead of having to react to single cases and demands in a short time. The concerned territory can be municipal, inter-municipal or larger.

The aim of this article is to present the methodology and tools used for designing a Commercial Location Development strategy.

Methodology and tools

Territorial diagnosis
The first step consists of assessing the CLD situation at the level of the considered territory. This can be done using both statistical data and interviews of local stakeholders. The collected information is then summarized using i.e. a  balanced scorecard (BSC) or SWOT analysis.

Competition analysis
After having identified the main territorial competitors, these ones are then assessed using as far as possible the same tools as for the territorial diagnosis. The results are then compared in order to determine in which topics and frame conditions the concerned commercial location has to improve to enhance its competitiveness versus its competitors.

Benchmarking
Ideas for the new strategy are then developed taking inspiration out of a benchmarking analysis and/or a best practices or worst practices inventory.

Designing of a commercial location development strategy
The strategy is then designed, democratically validated and implemented.

See also
 Alpine Space Programme - European Territorial Cooperation 2007-2013
 Comunis
 Land use planning
 Inter-municipal cooperation
 Spatial planning
 Regional planning
 European Spatial Development Perspective
 Urban planning
 City marketing
 Industrial ecology

References 

 Marketing Places by Philip Kotler, Donald Haider, and Irving Rein (Paperback 1993)
 Inter-municipal cooperation in Europe by Rudie Hulst et Andre van Montfort,(Springer, Paperback 2010)
 Environmental Management of Industrial Estates: Information and Training Resources (Training Manual plus CD-ROM, UNEP, 2002)
 Books and Monographs by International Society of Industrial Ecology (ISIE) Members

External links 
 European Territorial Cooperation 2007–2013 – Alpine Space Programme
 COMUNIS Homepage – Inter-municipal cooperation for Strategic Steering of SME-oriented Location Development in the Alpine Space
 COMUNIS Project description- Inter-municipal cooperation for Strategic Steering of SME-oriented Location Development in the Alpine Space
 COMUNIS Project Synthesis - Inter-municipal cooperation for Strategic Steering of SME-oriented Location Development in the Alpine Space
 COMUNIS Final Publication - Inter-municipal cooperation for Strategic Steering of SME-oriented Location Development in the Alpine Space
 COMUNIS Documents – Inter-municipal cooperation for Strategic Steering of SME-oriented Location Development in the Alpine Space
 Council of Europe – Good practices in intermunicipal co-operation in Europe, 2007
 Inter-municipal Cooperation (IMC) in Central and Eastern Europe (CEE)
 New Cornaredo District (NQC) Lugano Switzerland
 Technoark: Intermunicipal Business Park / Technopole Sierre Switzerland
 Micro-region Haute-Sorne, Jura, Suisse

Public economics